John Gregory Huarte (born April 6, 1944) is a former American football quarterback. He played college football at the University of Notre Dame for the Notre Dame Fighting Irish football team and won the 1964 Heisman Trophy. He then played professionally with a number of teams in the American Football League (AFL), the National Football League (NFL), and in the World Football League (WFL) between 1965 and 1975. Huarte was inducted into the College Football Hall of Fame in 2005.

Early years and college career
Huarte was born and raised in Orange County, California; his father Joseph was a former minor league baseball player of Basque descent. The family ran an orange and avocado ranch and he graduated from Mater Dei High School in Santa Ana in 1961.

Huarte played college football for the Notre Dame Fighting Irish. During his sophomore and junior seasons, he averaged only a few minutes per game due to injuries and the Irish went 5–5 and 2–7, respectively. As a senior in 1964 under new Irish head coach Ara Parseghian however, he became the starting quarterback as the Irish won all but one game during the 1964 season, in which he was selected as an All-American and won the Heisman Trophy. By the end of the season, Huarte threw for 2,062 yards with only 205 passes, an average of over ten yards per pass attempt, many to receiver Jack Snow.

Huarte was a member of the College All-Star team in the annual pre-season game against the defending NFL champions at Chicago's Soldier Field. The 1965 game was in early August against the Cleveland Browns and Huarte was named the game's most valuable player.

Professional career
Huarte was drafted in 1965 by both pro football leagues: he was the twelfth overall selection of the AFL draft and the 76th pick of the NFL draft. He signed with the AFL's New York Jets over the NFL Philadelphia Eagles, but was beaten out for the starting position by fellow-rookie Joe Namath, the first pick of the AFL draft. who had finished eleventh in the Heisman voting as a senior at Alabama. The AFL Jets thus signed both the Heisman Trophy winner and the Alabama star away from the NFL. Huarte was third on the depth chart behind co-starters Namath and Mike Taliaferro and was on the taxi squad. Following the 1965 season, Huarte was traded to the Boston Patriots for Jim Colclough and the draft rights to Wichita State linebacker/center Jim Waskiewicz.

Subsequently, Huarte did see action as a back-up quarterback for several other professional teams from 1966 to 1972. Out of the NFL in 1973, he played his final two seasons of professional football as the starting quarterback of the Memphis Southmen of the World Football League, which folded before the completion of the 1975 season.

After football
Huarte is  the founder and CEO of Arizona Tile. In 2005, he was inducted into the College Football Hall of Fame.

Huarte is married to Eileen Devine from Woodside, LI; they have 5 children and 14 grandchildren.
In 1977  he started a tile/granite store in San Diego. It has now grown to 30 locations, with over 1000 employees throughout  the United States. It is still family owned and operated by John and Eileen Huarte.

See also
 List of American Football League players

References

External links
 
 
 

1944 births
Living people
All-American college football players
American Football League players
American football quarterbacks
American people of Basque descent
Boston Patriots players
College Football Hall of Fame inductees
Chicago Bears players
Heisman Trophy winners
Kansas City Chiefs players
Memphis Southmen players
Notre Dame Fighting Irish football players
Philadelphia Eagles players
Players of American football from Anaheim, California
Sportspeople from Santa Ana, California